The 1933 Albanian National Championship was the fourth season of the Albanian National Championship, the top professional league for association football clubs.

Overview
The 1933 Albanian Superliga was contested by 5 teams, and Skënderbeu won the championship.

League standings

Results

Winning team of Skënderbeu
Klani Marjani, Kristaq Bimbli, Andrea Çani, Andon Miti, Lefter Petra, Fori Stassa, Nexhat Dishnica, Tomor Ypi, Thoma Vangjeli, Servet Teufik Agaj, Enver Kulla, Vasil Trebicka, Stavri Kondili, Aristotel Samsuri
COACH: Qemal Omari
Servet Teufik Agaj was the top-scorer with 7 goals.

References
Albania - List of final tables (RSSSF)
Calcio Mondiale Web ALBANIA - Campionato 1933
  Albanian National Championships
RSSSF

Kategoria Superiore seasons
1
Albania
Albania